Rene Gonzalez Architects (RGA) is an American architectural firm based in Miami, Florida. The work of their interdisciplinary design office encompasses architecture, interior architecture, landscape design, and product design. The firm's work includes museum and gallery spaces, hospitality, commercial, retail, and residential projects.

History
The office was founded in 1997 by Cuban-American architect Rene Gonzalez (b. 1963). Gonzalez received a Bachelor of Design degree from the University of Florida and holds a Master of Architecture degree from UCLA.

Work
RGA's cultural, museum, and gallery projects include the building for CasaCuba at Florida International University, a home for the discussion and study of Cuban affairs, and the Berkowitz Contemporary Foundation (BCF), a non-profit foundation in Miami.

Other museum projects include the 2014 master plan study for the expansion of the Wolfsonian-FIU museum, a building Gonzalez renovated alongside Sarasota School of Architecture architect Mark Hampton in 1992.

The firm also designed the Cisneros Fontanals Art Foundation (CIFO) for Ella Fontanals-Cisneros in 2005. The project is noted for its use of more than one million Bisazza glass mosaic tiles on the façade.

Key exhibition design projects have included the installation for the third (RED) Auction., which raised $10.5 million, with matching funds from the Bill & Melinda Gates Foundation, to support the fight against AIDS on December 5, 2018.

RGA also designed the exhibition titled 'Speed Limits' at the Wolfsonian-FIU in 2010 and designed and curated the product design exhibition titled 'Design Matters' at Miami’s Museum of Contemporary Art (MoCA) in 2000.

Hospitality and commercial projects by the firm include a new wing for The Standard Hotel in Miami, event company KARLA, restaurant Plant, and four boutiques for boutique Alchemist, the flagship of which is located in the 1111 Lincoln Road parking garage designed by architecture firm Herzog & de Meuron.

Notable residential projects include the Indian Creek Residence, which twice broke residential sales records in Miami-Dade County, first in 2012 at $45 million and again in 2019 for $50 million.

In 2017, RGA completed the Prairie Avenue Residence in Miami Beach, an elevated house designed to address the challenge of sea-level rise. The house was featured in The New York Times and in the BBC Two miniseries The World's Most Extraordinary Homes.

The firm has received recognition for its response to sea-level rise in South Florida.

Awards
The Miami chapter of the American Institute of Architects (AIA) recognized the firm's work in 2012 with an H. Samuel Kruse Silver Medal for Design  and in 2011 RGA was selected as Firm of the Year. RGA also earned two national AIA awards, one in 2006 for KARLA Conceptual Events and the other in 2011 for Alchemist.

The firm's monograph, titled 'Not Lost in Translation', was published by Monacelli Press in 2018 and its foreword was written by Tod Williams Billie Tsien Architects.

Other awards earned by the firm include:

 Interior Design Magazine's Best of the Year Award for Outdoor Seating for the Hammock chair
 Azure Magazine's AZ award for Design Excellence for Best Commercial Interior
 Interior Design magazine's 2013 Best of the Year Award for Retail Design
 2020 Archmarathon Awards 1st Prize for Villa Design for The Prairie Avenue Residence
 Better Beach Green Award (2019) and Platinum Winner (2016, 2019)
 Award for Innovative Architecture (2019) from the Miami Beach Chamber of Commerce

Gonzalez was named as one of 50 Top Coastal Architects of 2015 by Ocean Home magazine and earned the University of Florida’s School of Architecture 2010 Alumni Design Excellence Award.

Gonzalez has taught and lectured at UCLA, University of Virginia, University of Florida, University of Miami, and Florida International University. He was an honorary trustee at MoCA Miami and the Wolfsonian-FIU advisory board, and was Chair of the City of Miami Beach Design Review and the Historic Preservation Board.

Notable projects
 CasaCuba at Florida International University
 Pulse Memorial and Museum (with Diller Scofidio + Renfro) – shortlisted for design competition (2019) 
 Berkowitz Contemporary Foundation (2018)
 Prairie Avenue Residence (2017)
 Louver House, Miami Beach (2017) 
 Ron Rojas Residence, Key Biscayne (2017) 
 Plant, Miami (2016) 
 GLASS, Miami Beach (2015) 
 North Beach Oceanfront Center, Miami Beach (2014)
 Biscayne Bay Residence, Icon, Miami Beach (2010) 
 Indian Creek Residence, Miami Beach (2010)
 Alchemist boutiques (4), Miami Beach (2010, 2012, 2015, 2018)
 Cisneros Fontanals Art Foundation (CIFO), Miami (2005)
 KARLA Conceptual Events, Miami (2004)

Gallery

See also 
Ella Fontanals-Cisneros
1111 Lincoln Road

References

External links
 Official Website

Architecture firms
Architecture firms based in Florida
Design companies established in 1997
20th-century American architects
21st-century American architects
American people of Cuban descent
University of Florida alumni
University of California, Los Angeles alumni